Our Lady of the Pillar is the name given to the Blessed Virgin Mary in the context of the traditional belief that Mary, while living in Jerusalem, supernaturally appeared to the Apostle James the Greater in AD 40 while he was preaching in what is now Spain. Those who adhere to this belief consider this appearance to be the only recorded instance of Mary exhibiting the mystical phenomenon of bilocation. Among Catholics, it is also considered the first Marian apparition, and unique because it happened while Mary was still living on Earth.

This title is also associated with a wooden image commemorating the apparition, which is now enshrined at the Cathedral-Basilica of Our Lady of the Pillar in Zaragoza, Aragon, Spain. Pope Callixtus III granted indulgences for visitors to the shrine in 1456.  Pope Innocent XIII in 1730 mandated her veneration throughout the Spanish Empire. On 20 May 1905, Pope Pius X granted the image a canonical coronation.

Our Lady of the Pillar is considered the Patroness of Aragon and its capital Zaragoza, Hispanic people, the Hispanic world, and of the Spanish Civil Guard. Her feast day is 12 October, which coincides with Columbus Day, the national holiday of Spain.

History

Early tradition

Catholic tradition holds that, in the early days of Christianity, the Apostles of Jesus spread the Gospel throughout the known world, with James the Greater evangelizing in Roman Hispania (modern-day Spain). He confronted great difficulties in his missionary efforts and faced severe discouragement. In AD 40, while he was praying by the banks of the Ebro at Caesaraugusta (Zaragoza), Mary bilocated from Jerusalem, where she was living at the time, and appeared to James, accompanied by thousands of angels, to console and encourage him.

Some of the earliest archaeological evidence of Marian devotion in Zaragoza is found in Christian tombs dating from Roman days, which appear to bear images representing the Assumption of the Blessed Virgin. In the 4th century, the presence of votive images placed on columns or pillars is attested. The oldest written testimony of devotion to the Blessed Virgin in Zaragoza is usually identified as that of Pedro Librana in 1155. There is evidence that the site attracted pilgrims from across the Iberian Peninsula during the 13th century, e.g. reflected in the work Milagros de Nuestra Señora by Gonzalo de Berceo, dated to the 1250s or early 1260s. The appellation Santa María del Pilar is attested for 1299.
The claim that the first church had been the oldest in Hispania, built in AD 40 by James the Greater, is first recorded in 1318.

A book by Michael O'Neil (2015) called Exploring  the Miraculous indicates that there are various traditions about earliest approvals by the church of this marian apparition. From his book:

"For example, one of the great pilgrimage sites in Spain, Our Lady of the Pillar in Zaragoza, originating in a miracle and housing an ancient jasper Marian image on a column, did not always recognize Our Lady under this title. According to the legend relating to the apostle St. James the Greater and his travels in Spain, on January 2 in the year 40, he was disheartened with his lack of success in proclaiming the gospel in Caesaraugusta (present-day Zaragoza) by the river Ebro, when he saw Mary (still alive at the time) miraculously appear on a pillar, comforting him and calling him to return to Jerusalem. The first written mention of the Virgin of Zaragoza comes from a bishop in the middle of the twelfth century, and Zaragoza’s co-cathedral’s name did not originally include a reference to El Pilar, being called Santa Maria Mayor. In 1296, Pope Boniface VIII conferred an indulgence on pilgrims visiting this shrine but still without mention of Our Lady of the Pillar. One of the legal councils of Zaragoza first wrote about Our Lady under this title in 1299, promising safety and privileges to pilgrims who came to visit the shrine. In 1456, Pope Calixtus III issued a bull encouraging pilgrimage to Our Lady of the Pillar and confirming the name and the miraculous origin. So, despite the lack of early extant texts about the miracle story and the name of this devotion, the enduring tradition delivers the story to us today." In other interpretations,

the tradition of the Marian apparition can be traced to the 15th century: In either 1434 or 1435, a fire destroyed the alabaster altarpiece. The replacement altarpiece features bas-relief representations of the Marian apparition. The image of the Virgen del Pilar venerated today also dates to this period. It executed in the late Gothic style of Juan de la Huerta.

Pope Calixtus III in a bull issued on 23 September 1456 declares a seven-year indulgence for those who visit Our Lady of Saragossa. The text of the bull specifically mentions a pillar, for the first time suggesting the existence of an image known as Our Lady of the Pillar.
The feast day of 12 October was officially introduced by the Council of Zaragoza in 1640.

According to the account by María de Ágreda (d. 1665) in her Mystical City of God, Mary, mother of Jesus, was transported from Jerusalem to Hispania during the night, on a cloud carried by angels. During the journey, the angels also built a pillar of marble, and a miniature image of Mary with the Child Jesus.

Approval

The apparition of Our Lady of the Pillar was accepted as canonical by Pope Innocent XIII in 1723. So many contradictions had arisen concerning the miraculous origin of the church that Spain appealed to Innocent XIII to settle the controversy. After careful investigation, the twelve cardinals, in whose hands the affair rested, adopted the following account, which was approved by the Sacred Congregation of Rites on 7 August 1723, and later inserted in the lessons of the office of the feast of our Lady of the Pillar, celebrated on 12 October:

James returned to Jerusalem with some of his disciples where he became a martyr, beheaded in AD 44 during the reign of Herod Agrippa. His disciples allegedly returned his body to Spain. The year AD 40 is the earliest recognised Marian apparition in the Catholic Church,  dating to a time when Mary, the mother of Jesus, was still alive. 
 
Pope Clement XII allowed the celebration of the feast of Our Lady of the Pillar all over the Spanish Empire in 1730.  Since the feast day (12 October) coincides with the discovery of the Americas (12 October 1492), Mary was later named as Patroness of the Hispanic World under this title.

Image

Zaragoza

A fire in 1434 burned down the church that preceded the present basilica.
The construction of the present Basilica of Our Lady of the Pillar, Zaragoza was started in 1681 and ended in 1711. 

The wooden statue of the Blessed Virgin Mary is in the Late Gothic style.
The statue depicts Mary with the Child Jesus on her left arm, who has a dove sitting on his left palm.

Some reports state that an earlier wooden image was destroyed when the church burned down in 1434, consistent with an attribution of the current image to Juan de la Huerta (d. 1462) or his school.

It appears that folk belief in some cases may be inclined to regard the Saragossa image as miraculous, sculptured by the angels as they transported Mary from Jerusalem to Saragossa (Zaragoza); this mystical tradition goes back to María de Ágreda (d. 1665),  herself the object of frequent "mystical bilocation" (i.e. she reported that she was often "transported by the aid of the angels" ), who gave an account to this effect in her Mystical City of God; however, unlike the tradition of the Marian apparition itself, the miraculous origin of the image is not part of the tradition recognized by the Holy See as canonical.

Since the 16th century, the pillar is usually draped in a skirt-like cover called manto "mantle".
As a whole, it is protected by a bronze case and then another case of silver.
The image was canonically crowned in 1905 during the reign of Pope Pius X.  The crown was designed by the Marquis of Griñi, valued at 450,000 pesetas (c. USD 2.6 million as of 2017).

Other depictions
Our Lady of the Pillar is a common motif of the Madonna and Child in Spanish art; extant examples other than the Saragossa image date from the Renaissance period onward. Depictions become especially numerous following the introduction of the feast day throughout the Spanish Empire in 1730.

Feast day

The feast of Our Lady of the Pillar is celebrated on 12 October and she is the Patroness of the Hispanic peoples and the Spanish Civil Guard.  A grand nine-day festival known as Fiestas del Pilar is celebrated in Saragossa (Zaragoza) every year in her honour. The modern Fiestas del Pilar, as they developed since the 19th century, begin on the weekend preceding 12 October and they end on the Sunday after 12 October (i.e. they move between 5–13 and 11–19 October). They were declared as a "national holiday of touristic interest" (Fiesta de Interés Turístico Nacional) by the Ministerio de Comercio y Turismo in 1980.

As 12 October coincides with the day of the year 1492 when land was first sighted on Columbus's First Voyage, 
the Fiesta de la Raza Española, first proposed in 1913 by Faustino Rodríguez-San Pedro y Díaz-Argüelles to fall on the same date. In the United States, this was later called "Columbus Day", as Columbus tends to be more associated with Italy and Italian-Americans, rather than the Spanish and Latin America in the U.S. 
The Fiesta de la Raza Española was declared the national holiday of Spain in a decree by Antonio Maura and king Alfonso XIII
of 1918. The alternative name Día de la Hispanidad was proposed in the late 1920s by Ramiro de Maeztu, based on a suggestion by Zacarías de Vizcarra.
After the Civil War, on 12 October 1939, the Día de la Raza was celebrated in Saragossa (Zaragoza), presided by Francisco Franco, with a special devotion to the Virgen del Pilar. Chilean foreign vice-secretary Germán Vergara Donoso commented that the "profound significance of the celebration was the intimate inter-penetration of the homage to the Race and the devotion to Our Lady of the Pillar, i.e. the symbol of the ever more extensive union between America and Spain."
The name of Día de la Hispanidad was introduced as the official name of the national holiday in a decree of 9 January 1958.
During the transition to democracy, there was a proposal to shift the national day to 6 December, the day of adoption of the Constitution, but in the end, in a decree of 1982, the day of 12 October was retained, under the name of  Fiesta Nacional de España y Día de la Hispanidad. In 1987, the name was reduced to just Día de la Fiesta Nacional de España.

Veneration of Our Lady of the Pillar around the world

Pilar, short for Maria del Pilar, is a common Spanish given name, with name day on the feast of Our Lady of the Pillar.

Caribbean

 Parroquia Nuestra Señora del Pilar, Río Piedras, Puerto Rico
 Iglesia Nuestra Señora del Pilar, Havana, Cuba

South America
 Cathedral of Our Lady of the Pillar and St. Raphael in Melo, Uruguay
 Nuestra Señora del Pilar, Recoleta neighbourhood, Buenos Aires, Argentina
 Nuestra Señora del Pilar, Pilar, Buenos Aires Province, Argentina
 Cathedral of Our Lady of the Pillar, São João del-Rei, Brazil

Philippines
In the Philippines, ruled by Spain for over three hundred years, Our Lady of the Pillar is honored as the patroness of a number parishes and municipalities; seven are named Pilar in her honor.  There are towns named Pilar in the provinces of Abra, Bataan, Bohol, Capiz, Cebu, Surigao del Norte and Sorsogon.  As in Spain, her feast day is celebrated every 12 October.
 In Zamboanga City, the Virgin of the Pillar has been venerated for almost four centuries as the patroness of the city and in the Archdiocese of Zamboanga. The bas relief of her atop the eastern gate of the 17th-century Spanish military fort dedicated to the Virgin, Fort Pilar (Full name: Royal Fort of our Virgin Lady of the Pillar of Zaragoza, El Fuerte Real de Nuestra Señora Virgen del Pilar de Zaragoza), is now a Catholic Marian shrine. The city also has a street named after her – Pilar Street.
 In Davao City, a shrine in honor of Nuestra Señora del Pilar in Magsaysay Park was built through the collaborative efforts of Circulo Zamboangueño de Davao, a local group of transposed from Zamboanga City.
 Our Lady of the Pillar is also the patroness of Santa Cruz parish church in the district of the same name, in the city of Manila.  The Jesuits brought the patroness when they administered the church during the Spanish era.  Her feast day is also celebrated every 12 October in the district. However, the church has its Marian procession in the 3rd week of October. The image was canonically crowned on 7 December 2017.
 Our Lady of the Pillar is the patroness of Imus, Cavite and the Diocese of Imus enshrined at the Imus Cathedral in Cavite. The city celebrates its fiesta every October with the Karakol, a ritual dance-procession performed in fiestas around the province of Cavite. The image was canonically crowned on 3 December 2012. 
 Our Lady of the Pillar is also the patroness, with 12 October as the feast day, in the following places:
City of Cauayan, Isabela.
Town of Morong, Bataan.
Don Rufino Alonzo Sr. Street Cotabato City Maguindanao.
Town of Baleno, Masbate.
Town of Pilar, Bataan.
Town of Pilar, Bohol.
Town of Pilar, Capiz 
Town of Pilar, Sorsogon.
Town of San Simon, Pampanga. 
Town of Sibonga, Cebu.
 Town of Alaminos, Laguna.
Town of Mamburao, Occidental Mindoro.
Town & Diocese of Libmanan, Camarines Sur
Brgy. Kalubkob, Silang, Cavite
Brgy. Guinsay, Danao, Cebu
Brgy. New Guinlo, Taytay, Palawan
Brgy. Del Pilar, Zaragoza, Nueva Ecija
Brgy. Lumbangan, Nasugbu, Batangas
Brgy. Indangan, Makilala, Cotabato
Brgy. Maao, Bago, Negros Occidental

References

De Plancy, J. Collin (1852), "Legends of the Blessed Virgin", London, 261–267.
Lasagabáster Arratíbel, Daniel (1999), Historia de la Santa Capilla de Nuestra Señora del Pilar, Zaragoza (Reyes de Aragón, 5), .
Nogués y Secall, Mariano  (1862). Historia crítica y apologética de la Virgen nuestra señora del Pilar de Zaragoza y de su templo y tabernáculo desde el siglo I hasta nuestros días, Madrid, Alejandro Gómez Fuentenebro.
O'Neill, Michael Exploring the Miraculous (2015) Our Sunday Visitor Publishing Division Our Sunday Visitor, Inc. Huntington, Indiana 46750,  (Inventory No. T1585)

External links

Archdiocese of Zaragoza Official Website (in Spanish)
International Marian Research Institute at the University of Dayton. The institute, a leading center for research and scholarship on the Blessed Virgin Mary, has a vast presence in cyberspace.
Marian Library at the University of Dayton. The Marian Library is the world's largest repository of books, periodicals, artwork, and artifacts on Mary, the mother of Jesus Christ.

Our Lady of the Pillar
Pillar
Pillar
Pillar
History of Catholicism in Spain
Catholic holy days
Statues of the Madonna and Child
Marian devotions